David Brook is a Grammy Award winning American songwriter from Marblehead, Massachusetts. He is best known for co-writing Eminem's Legacy, OneRepublic and Galantis's Bones", Charlie Puth's Some Type of Love, and Jason Derulo's "Broke" featuring Stevie Wonder and Keith Urban. Upon graduating Northeastern University, David moved to New York City where he was signed to Universal Music Publishing Group. David now resides in Los Angeles, California.

Selected songwriting discography

References

1987 births
Living people
21st-century American composers
American male songwriters
21st-century American male musicians